German submarine U-125 was a Type IXC U-boat of Nazi Germany's Kriegsmarine during World War II. She was laid down at the DeSchiMAG AG Weser as yard number 988 on 10 May 1940, launched on 10 December and commissioned on 3 March 1941. The boat was a member of three wolfpacks. She was sunk on 6 May 1943. All 54 men on board died.

Design
German Type IXC submarines were slightly larger than the original Type IXBs. U-125 had a displacement of  when at the surface and  while submerged. She had two shafts and two  propellers.

U-125 was fitted with six  torpedo tubes (four fitted at the bow and two at the stern), 22 torpedoes, one  SK C/32 naval gun, 180 rounds, and a  SK C/30 as well as a  C/30 anti-aircraft gun. The boat had a complement of forty-eight.

Service history

First and second patrols
U-125 departed Kiel on 15 July 1941 on her first patrol, under the command of Kapitänleutnant Günter Kuhnke, arriving in the recently captured French Atlantic port of Lorient fourteen days later. Her route took her along the Norwegian coast, through the gap separating the Faroe and Shetland Islands and into the Atlantic Ocean.

Her second patrol took her down the coast of West Africa, then through the Atlantic and back to her home-port without making any attacks. She ranged far and wide, heading for Brazil and back to Africa, toward Sierra Leone and Liberia.

Third patrol
U-125 had her first success on her third patrol, under her new commander Kapitänleutnant Ulrich Folkers, sinking the American merchant ship West Ivis off Cape Hatteras, North Carolina on 26 January 1942. The ship broke in two and went down after 14 minutes. The crew of 36 and the nine Armed Guards (the ship was armed with a 4-inch (100mm) gun, four .50 cal. and four .30 cal. machine guns) were lost.

Fourth patrol
U-125 sailed on her fourth and most successful patrol from Lorient on 4 April 1942. Between 3 – 18 May, she sank a further eight merchant ships, in the Caribbean, south of Cuba, returning to her home port on 13 June. One victim, Calgarolite, was hit by two torpedoes but despite settling, did not sink. The boat's AA guns were used to shoot holes in the hull. Following the demise of Camayagua, a US Navy aircraft unsuccessfully searched for the U-boat; then flew to Georgetown where it dropped a note in the Commissioner's garden with information on the survivors.

Fifth and sixth patrols
U-125s next patrol, the fifth, beginning on 27 July 1942, took her to the coast of West Africa, where she sank six merchant ships between 1 September and 8 October, returning to Lorient on 6 November 1942. Following the sinking of Baron Ogilvy on 29 September, the survivors sighted a small convoy on 1 October and succeeded in attracting their attention with flares. Unfortunately, one of them ignited in the Chief Officer's hand, causing severe burns.

The Glendene went to the bottom 90 seconds after being hit. Despite this rapidity, 38 of the 43-man crew survived the sinking.

U-125 sailed on her sixth patrol on 9 December 1942, out into the central Atlantic, south-west of the Azores, but she made no attacks before returning to Lorient on 19 February 1943.

Seventh patrol and loss
U-125 left Lorient for the last time on her seventh patrol on 13 April 1943. She joined the "wolfpack" "Fink" (English: Finch) of 28 U-boats which were attacking the convoy ONS-5 between 26 April and 6 May 1943. This was during a period when the British code-breakers were unable to read German U-boat signals while they could read British convoy signals, and ONS-5 was intercepted by a strong U-boat force during an Atlantic storm. Nevertheless, the boat only sank one ship, on 4 May south of Cape Farewell (Greenland), she was perhaps ironically called Lorient, a straggler from ONS-5; there were no survivors.

ONS-5 was a 43-ship convoy, nine miles wide by two long, with one destroyer, one frigate, three corvettes and two rescue tugs to defend it. It was attacked by around thirty U-boats, and lost thirteen ships in total, while seven U-boats were sunk by the escorts and supporting aircraft. It was a particularly bloody battle which marked the turning point in the Battle of the Atlantic, showing that while determined mass attack by U-boats could break through convoy defences, this would prove too expensive a tactic to make U-boat warfare a winning strategy for Germany. Admiral Karl Dönitz lost his son in this battle.

Fate
The captain of Snowflake signalled the Senior Officer Escort, Lieutenant Commander Robert Sherwood, proposing to pick them up, and received the response: "Not approved to pick up survivors." Snowflake and Sunflower thereupon resumed their positions around the convoy, while the crew of U-125 died in the Atlantic over the next few hours.

Summary of raiding history

See also
List of successful U-boats
Black May (1943)

References

Bibliography

External links

German Type IX submarines
U-boats commissioned in 1941
U-boats sunk in 1943
World War II submarines of Germany
1940 ships
World War II shipwrecks in the Atlantic Ocean
Ships built in Bremen (state)
U-boats sunk by British warships
Ships lost with all hands
Maritime incidents in May 1943